New Orleans Piano is a 1972 album by Professor Longhair. It consists of material recorded in 1949 and 1953, including tracks previously released by Atlantic Records.

The 1953 recording of "Tipitina" was added to the US National Recording Registry in 2011.

In 2003, the album was ranked number 220 on Rolling Stone magazine's list of the 500 greatest albums of all time, and 222 in a 2012 revised list.

Track listing

1989 reissue

Personnel

1953 session 
 Roy Byrd – vocals, piano
 Lee Allen – tenor saxophone
 Red Tyler – baritone saxophone
 Edgar Blanchard – bass
 Earl Palmer – drums

1949 session 
 Roy Byrd – vocals, piano
 Robert Parker – alto saxophone
 Al Miller or John Woodrow – drums
 Unknown – bass
 Unknown (thought to be Charles Burbank (or Burbeck?) – tenor saxophone

References 

 Leadbitter, Mike (1989). New Orleans Piano. [CD liner notes]. Atlantic Jazz.

1972 compilation albums
Professor Longhair albums
Albums produced by Jerry Wexler
Albums produced by Ahmet Ertegun
Atlantic Records albums